In physics, specifically general relativity, the Mathisson–Papapetrou–Dixon equations describe the motion of a massive spinning body moving in a gravitational field. Other equations with similar names and mathematical forms are the Mathisson–Papapetrou equations and Papapetrou–Dixon equations. All three sets of equations describe the same physics.

They are named for M. Mathisson, W. G. Dixon, and A. Papapetrou.

Throughout, this article uses the natural units c = G = 1, and tensor index notation.

Mathisson–Papapetrou–Dixon equations
The Mathisson–Papapetrou–Dixon (MPD) equations for a mass  spinning body are 

Here  is the proper time along the trajectory,  is the body's four-momentum
 
the vector  is the four-velocity of some reference point  in the body, and the skew-symmetric tensor  is the angular momentum 

of the body about this point. In the time-slice integrals we are assuming that the body is compact enough that we can use flat coordinates within the body where the energy-momentum tensor  is non-zero.

As they stand, there are only ten equations to determine thirteen quantities. The equations must therefore be supplemented by three additional constraints which serve to determine which point in the body has velocity . Mathison and Pirani originally chose to impose the condition  which, although involving four components, contains only three constraints because  is identically zero. This condition, however, does not lead to a unique solution and can give rise to the mysterious "helical motions".

Accepting the Tulczyjew–Dixon condition , we can manipulate the second of the MPD equations into the form 

This is a form of Fermi–Walker transport of the spin tensor along the trajectory – but one preserving orthogonality to the momentum vector  rather than to the tangent vector . Dixon calls this M-transport.

See also

Introduction to the mathematics of general relativity
Geodesic equation
Pauli–Lubanski pseudovector
Test particle
Relativistic angular momentum
Center of mass (relativistic)

References

Notes

Selected papers

Equations
General relativity